Gary Lawrence Bautell (May 31, 1942November 22, 2022) was an AFN Europe radio announcer living in Wiesbaden, Germany. During his more than 60 years at AFN, he introduced postwar Germany to American rock ‘n’ roll and interviewed a slew of national and military leaders. Bautell was once called “the voice of the U.S. military in Europe.” Having worked in Germany for over 50 years, he became involved in promoting German–American relations. Bautell also served as the president of the Federation of German-American Clubs.

Biography
Gary Lawrence Bautell was born on May 31, 1942, in Bay City, Michigan. He joined AFN Europe in 1962 as a private first class in the United States Army. Having previously been stationed in Karlsruhe, Germany as a combat engineer, Bautell re-enlisted in the Army after working as a DJ in Houghton Lake, Michigan.

Bautell initially worked for AFN Frankfurt at Hoechst Castle as an announcer before transitioning to news broadcasts. In this capacity, he interviewed every German chancellor from Willy Brandt to Angela Merkel, several US Secretaries of Defense, and Presidents Bill Clinton and George W. Bush. Due to the popularity of AFN programs among American military personnel as well as German civilians, his voice was widely recognized in Germany. In addition to Frankfurt, he also worked at Stuttgart and Wiesbaden. 

Bautell's work had been recognized as influencing German popular culture, especially though the introduction of elements in American popular culture. For the first few decades of Bautell's broadcasting, German radio played "boring" music, such as folk music. Though broadcasting for American military personnel, Bautell and AFN Europe introduced German listeners to American artists such as Little Richard, Johnny Cash, and Jimi Hendrix. His programs also included swing and jazz music, which had been banned under the Nazis.

Death
Bautell died in Wiesbaden, Germany on November 23, 2022.

References

1942 births
2022 deaths
American expatriates in Germany 
American expatriates in West Germany 
American radio DJs
American Forces Network
Burials at Rose Hills Memorial Park
Michigan State University alumni
Military personnel from Michigan
Military personnel of the Cold War
People from Bay City, Michigan
People from Gladwin, Michigan
People from Wiesbaden
Radio and television announcers
Radio personalities from Michigan
United States Army soldiers